As If Apart is the second studio album by American singer-songwriter Chris Cohen, released on May 6, 2016, by Captured Tracks.

Track listing 
Lyrics were contributed by Zach Phillips on two songs: "Memory" and "As If Apart."
 "Torrey Pine"
 "As If Apart"
 "Drink from a Silver Cup"
 "Memory"
 "In a Fable"
 "Needle and Thread"
 "The Lender"
 "Sun Has Gone Away"
 "No Plan"
 "Yesterday's On My Mind"

Personnel 
 Chris Cohen - drums, bass, guitar, piano, keyboard, vocal

References 

2016 albums
Captured Tracks albums
Chris Cohen (musician) albums